Cora Johnstone Best (1878 – ) and Audrey Forfar Shippam (March 24, 1883 – ) were American mountaineers who summitted peaks in North America, Asia, and Europe.  In the 1920s, they had a film lecture series where Best described their exploits.

Early life 
Cora Johnstone Best was born in Minnesota and became a medical doctor. She and her husband, Dr. Robert Best, ran a private hospital in Minneapolis whose work included medical care for Native American children. Their home in Minneapolis, "Sundance Lodge", became a meeting place for outdoor enthusiasts, poets, and scientists. Best was a public speaker as early as 1918 and an advocate for physical education in schools.

Mountaineering 
Best credited a postcard she saw as a child of an alpine lake for her interest in mountaineering. In 1920, she climbed Mount Assiniboine and joined the Alpine Club of Canada (ACC).  In 1922, Best founded the Minneapolis chapter of the ACC and was the first female head of an ACC chapter, at a time when prejudice against women participating in mountaineering was high.

It is not clear when Best met Shippam, but Shippam was a member of the ACC and they spent the next decade together summitting peaks on multiple continents, including a first ascent of Mount Iconoclast. They were also the first women to ascend Mount Hungabee.

In 1922, Best was hired as a public speaker by the Bureau of Commercial Economics (BCE), a non-profit film distribution organization.  Best spoke about the pair's mountaineering adventures and Shippam produced film and hand-colored lantern slides to accompany Best's lectures.  The series of film lectures included "Hell Roaring Waters", about a 200-mile canoe trip down the Columbia River, "Kingdom of the Clouds,"about reaching the summit of Mount Pope, and "Unblazed Trails and Shining Peaks," about the Canadian Rockies.

In 1927, Best and Shippam embarked on an adventure in Manchuria at the start of the Chinese Civil War. They intended to head for the Khingan Mountains and hunt a snow leopard, but negative attention from Chinese troops prompted them to disguise themselves as East Indians by darkening their faces with chrome yellow. They had their food stolen, engaged in a gunfight with bandits, and Best came down with dysentery before both made it to Port Arthur. They then travelled to Japan and climbed the Karasawa Ridge, Mount Fuji, and Mount Aso.

Best passed away in Minneapolis in 1930 following a lung infection that she had developed during a climb in Switzerland.

Shippam worked as a painter and printmaker in Bulingame, California. She exhibited at the Golden Gate International Exposition in 1940.

References 

Created via preloaddraft
American female climbers
Sports duos
American public speakers